Sabah (born Jeanette Gerges Feghali, ; 10 November 1927 – 26 November 2014) was a Lebanese singer and actress. She participated in many Egyptian movies and songs. She was among the first Arabic singers to perform at the Olympia, Carnegie Hall, Royal Albert Hall, Piccadilly Theatre, and the Sydney Opera House.

Early life
Sabah was born to a Maronite Christian family in Bdadoun in Aley. She was the third of three daughters. She came from a troubled family; her father neglected and bullied her and tried to steal her early movie earnings. Her first marriage was to escape her father's control. Her brother also killed her mother because he believed she was having an affair.

Career

Sabah emerged when the field of Arab singers was already crowded with formidable competitors. These included Umm Kulthum (1898-1975), Nagat El Sagheera (born 1938), Warda Al-Jazairia (1939–2012), Shadia (1931–2017), Fairuz (born 1934), and others. 

Sabah started singing at a young age and released her first song in Lebanon in 1940 at age 13. She went to Egypt in the early 1940s, where she first participated in the movie El-Qalb Luh Wahid (The Heart Has Its Reasons), released in 1945, which gained her regional fame. She then became officially known by her character's name — Sabah, Arabic for "morning". She also acquired several affectionate nicknames, including "Chahroura" ("songbird"), "Ustura" (legend) and "Sabbouha," a diminutive of Sabah.

Among her most popular films were The Night is Ours (1949), My Father Deceived Me (1951), That's What Love Is (1961), Soft Hands (1963), Three Women (1968), Paris and Love (1972), and The Second Man (1959), in which she played a cabaret singer who vows to avenge her brother's death at the hands of a smuggling ring.She sang at wedding in Lebanon during the Lebanese civil war.

In the 1990s, she and her former husband, Fadi Lubnan (Kuntar), made a documentary about her life, which aired on Future Television under the title "The Journey of My Life" (مشوار حياتي).

In her parallel music career, she recorded more than 3,000 songs, working with a string of well-known Egyptian composers, including the late Mohammed Abdel Wahab. She specialized in a Lebanese folk tradition called the mawal, and her most famous songs included "Zay el-Assal" ("Your Love is Like Honey on my Heart") and "Akhadou el-Reeh" ("They Took the Wind"). Sabah released over 50 albums and acted in 98 films during her career. Sabah's youthfulness and the joy she brought in her performances made her a living symbol of the "belle époque" and the "joie de vivre" in the Levant and the Arab world.

Until 2009, she performed in concert and on television, including programs such as Star Academy. She also collaborated closely with singer Rola Saad in remaking some of her old hits, such as "Yana Yana." The accompanying video, in which Sabah is shown as "the notorious diva" to whom her younger colleague pays tribute, has received wide play on Arabic music channels. Sabah was hosted on the TV show Akher Man Yalam on 31 May 2010. In the 2011 edition of the Beiteddine Art Festival, a show retracing the journey of Sabah as a singer and movie star was performed. In the title role, Rouwaida Attieh shared the stage with more than 40 singers and dancers to honor her works. 

In 2010, she retired due to an illness that left her with paralysis in one of her arms and legs.

Personal life
Sabah carried four passports from different countries: Lebanon, Egypt, Jordan, and the United States.

She married Lebanese businessman Najib Chammas when she was 18, but would go on to marry nine more times, most notably to Egyptian actor Rushdy Abaza, as well as Egyptian musician Anwar Mansy, Egyptian television presenter Ahmed Farraj, Lebanese politician Youssef (Joe) Hammoud, and Lebanese author-director Wassim Tabbara. Hammoud allegedly divorced Sabah in the 1970s due to a scandal following a performance where she wore revealing shorts. Her penultimate marriage, which lasted 17 years, was to the much-younger Lebanese artist Fadi Lubnan. Her final marriage was to Joseph Gharib in 2013, at the age of 85.

She had two children, Sabah Chammas (from her marriage to Najib Chammas) and Howayda Mansy (from her marriage to Anwar Mansy). Sabah is a medical doctor, and Howayda, is a singer, actress, and socialite. Both of her children live in the United States.

After selling her house in Hazmieh, which she described as "too big and cold for only one person," she moved to the neighboring Hotel Comfort in Baabda, Mount Lebanon, a hill city overlooking Beirut and the Mediterranean Sea. She later lived in another hotel next to Baabda.  

Sabah is the aunt of Brazilian congresswoman Jandira Feghali. Her brother, Ricardo Feghali, is a musician, songwriter, and member of the highly acclaimed Brazilian band Roupa Nova.

Death
Rumors of Sabah's death circulated days before she died. Amused by the rumors, Sabah said, "Even in my death, I'm making people busy."

Sabah died on 26 November 2014, around 3:00 a.m., sixteen days after her 87th birthday, in her home at Hotel Brazilia from unspecified reasons. Clauda Akl, the daughter of her sister, actress Lamia Feghaly, published the news on her webpage at around 6:45 a.m. She mentioned that Sabah wished people would not feel sad and dance the Dabkeh at her funeral, saying “I've lived enough.” After her death, her hairdresser Joseph Gharib said in an interview that Sabah loved to wear red lipstick during her last days. She considered Joseph Gharib her son, and he considered her his mother. 

On Sunday, 30 November 2014, four days after Sabah's death, thousands of people filled the streets to pay their respects. Her family, Lebanese officials, and many Arab delegates packed into St. George Cathedral in downtown Beirut to bid farewell to the singer, actress, and entertainer.

In front of the cathedral, the official Lebanese Army band played the national anthem, followed by many songs from Sabah's repertoire, a first in the country's history. Fans clapped and sang their favorite Sabah songs. A troupe of dancers in traditional dress performed to her music playing from loudspeakers.

For the funeral mass, Sabah's flag-draped coffin stood near the altar with a giant picture of the singer as a younger woman with her signature voluminous peroxide-blond hair. After the service, mourners carried the casket to a hearse waiting outside while people clapped, threw flowers, and reached out to touch it and take photographs. Sabah's body was carried through many towns to the church of her hometown of Bdadoun, where she was buried.

Legacy
Al Shahrourah, a TV drama based on her life, aired during Ramadan in 2011. She was portrayed by actress/singer Carole Samaha. Sabah's reaction was positive toward the series. She was happy that it was a success, though she commented about certain inaccuracies, such as the depiction of her father as wearing traditional Lebanese garb.

Months before she died, the Lebanese journalist Rima Njeim hosted a TV episode honoring her, which aired live on MTV Lebanon.

A museum is being built in her village Bdadoun, which will contain her private letters, dresses, wardrobe accessories, rare old photographs of her and other memorabilia.

Her music is being taught in music classes in Lebanon.

In 2015, graffiti artists Halwani and the brothers Omar and Mohammad Kabbani commemorated Sabah in monumental murals on the sides of buildings in Beirut, paying tribute to the way she defied gender-based and other social taboos, challenging Lebanon's culture of sectarianism and providing an alternative to images of political leaders and their sloganeering.

On 10 November 2017, Google celebrated what would have been her 90th birthday with a Google Doodle.

Marvel's Moon Knight TV series plays her song Saat Saat from the 1980 Egyptian movie A Night When The Moon Cried, at the end of Episode 5.

Awards
In 2004 was honored at the Alexandria Song Festival and the Cairo Film Festival. That same year, she was honored in Beirut with a statue.

In 2010 she received a Lifetime Achievement Award from the Dubai International Film Festival.

She was honored by the Lebanese Republic many times, e.g. by receiving the National Order of the Cedar medal.

Work
Sabah released over 50 albums and acted in 98 movies, and over 20 stage plays. She had a reported repertoire of over 3,500 songs.

Selected filmography
Source:
1986 Ayyam El Lulu ايام اللولو aka = Days Of The Lulu
1972 Paris wal Hob باريس والحب aka= Paris and Love
1970 Kanet Ayyam كانت ايام aka =It Were Days
1970 Nar El Shoq نار الشوق aka = Fire Of Longing
1969 Easabet El Nesa عصابة النساء aka =  Gang Of Women
1968 Thalath Nesaa ثلاث نساء aka = Three Women
1966 Mawwal El Aqdam El Zahabiyyah موال الاقدام الذهبية aka =Popular Song Of Golden Feet
1963 El Aydi el naema  الايدى الناعمة aka = The Soft Hands
1963 El Motamaradah المطاردة aka = The Chase 
1961 El Hob Keda الحب كده aka = That's What Love Is
1961 Goz merti جوز مراتى aka = Husband Of My Wife
1960 El Ragol El Thani الرجل الثانى aka = The Second Man
1959 El Ataba El Khadra العتبه الخضرا aka=The Green Threshold
1958 Shari' El Hobb  شارع الحب aka = Love Sreet
1958 Sallem Al Habayib سلم ع الحبايب aka = Say Hello To Lovers
1956 Izayy Ansak ازاى انساك aka= How To Forget You
1956 Wahabtak Hayati وهبتك حياتى aka = I Gave You My Life
1954 Khataf merati خطف مراتى aka = He Kidnapped My Wife
1953 Lahn Hobbi  لحن حبى aka = Melody Of My Heart
1953 Zalamuni El Habayib ظلمونى الحبايب aka = Were Unjust To Me, The Lovers
1951  Khada'ni Abi  خدعنى ابى aka = My Father Deceived Me
1950 Ana Satuta انا ستوته aka = I'm Sattutah
1949 Al lailu lana الليل لنا aka = The Night is Ours
1948 Sabah El kher صباح الخير aka  = Good Morning 
1947 Albi W Sefi قلبى و سيفى aka  = My Heart And My Sword
1947 lebnani Fi El gam'ah لبنانى فى الجامعة aka = Lebanese In University

Selected discography 
Source:

References

1927 births
2014 deaths
Lebanese film actresses
Lebanese stage actresses
20th-century Lebanese women singers
Lebanese Maronites
Naturalized citizens of Egypt
Egyptian Christians
Rotana Records artists
People from Mount Lebanon Governorate
Singers who perform in Egyptian Arabic